TTBP can refer to
2,4,6-Tri-tert-butylpyrimidine
2,4,6-Tri-tert-butylphenol